The following is a bibliography of the works of Mikhail Bulgakov in English and Russian.

Bibliography in English
In chronological order of translation

Novels 
The Master and Margarita
 translated by Mirra Ginsburg, New York: Grove Press, 1967, 1995. London: Picador, 1989.
 translated by Michael Glenny, London: Harvill, 1967; New York: Harper & Row, 1967; with introduction by Simon Franklin, New York: Knopf, 1992; London: Everyman's Library, 1992.
 translated by Diana Burgin and Katherine O'Connor, annotations and afterword by Ellendea Proffer, Ann Arbor: Ardis, 1993, 1995.
 translated by Richard Pevear and Larissa Volokhonsky, London: Penguin, 1997; London: Folio Society, 2010 with Introduction by Orlando Figes. 
 translated by Michael Karpelson, Lulu Press, 2006; Wordsworth Classics 2011. 
 translated by Hugh Aplin, One World Classics, 2008. 
Heart of a Dog, translated by Mirra Ginsburg, New York: Grove Press, 1968; London: Picador, 1990. 
 The White Guard (or White Guard)
 translated by Michael Glenny, London, HarperCollins/Havill, 1971; New York: McGraw-Hill 1971; London, Fontana 1973; 
 translated by Marian Schwartz, Introduction by Evgeny Dobrenko: Yale University Press, 2008. 
 translated by Roger Cockrell. Richmond: Alma Classics, 2012
 Theatrical Novel (Notes of a Dead Man)
Black Snow: Theatrical Novel, translated by Michael Glenny, London: Hodder and Stoughton, 1967; London: Collins-Harvill, 1986, 1991, 1996.
A Dead Man's Memoir: A Theatrical Novel, translated by Andrew Bromfield.  London: Penguin, 2007.
Black Snow, translated by Roger Cockrell. Richmond: Alma Books, 2014.

Short stories 
Great Soviet Short Stories, New Laurel edition, New York: Dell. 1962, 1990. Contains Adventures of Chichikov.
Diaboliad and Other Stories
 translated by Carl R. Proffer, edited by Ellendea and Carl Proffer, Indiana University Press, 1972; Ann Arbor: Ardis, 1990, 1993; with an introduction by Julie Curtis, London: Harvill, 1991; 
 translated by Hugh Aplin, plus notes and extra material. Richmond: Oneworld Classics, 2010. 
A Country Doctor's Notebook, translated by Michael Glenny, London: Collins-Harvill, 1975, 1990, 1995.
The Terrible News: Russian stories from the years following the Revolution, London:Black Spring Press, 1990, 1991. Contains The Red crown.
Notes on the Cuff & Other Stories, translated by Alison Rice, Ann Arbor: Ardis, 1991.
The Fatal Eggs and Other Soviet Satire, 1918-1963, edited and translated by Mirra Ginsburg, London: Quartet, 1993.

Theater
The Early Plays of Mikhail Bulgakov, translated by Carl R. Proffer and Ellendea Proffer, Dana Point: Ardis Publishers, 1990, 1995.
Peace Plays: Two, selected and introduced by D. Lowe, London: Methuen Drama, 1990. Contains Adam and Eve.
Zoya's Apartment: A Tragic Farce in Three Acts, translated by Nicholas Saunders and Frank Dwyer, New York: Samuel French, 1991.
Zoyka's Apartment (revised: adaptation of 1929 and 1935 texts), translated and adapted by Nicholas Saunders and Frank Dwyer, Smith and Kraus, 1996.
Six Plays, translated by William Powell, Michael Glenny and Michael Earley, introduced by Lesley Milne, London: Methuen Drama, 1991, 1994 (includes bibliographical references). Contains The White Guard, Madame Zoyka, Flight, Molière (The Cabal of Hypocrites, Adam and Eve, The Last Days.

Bibliography in Russian
The transliteration and the literal translation of the title is given in square brackets

Novels and short stories
 Записки на манжетах [Zapiski na manzhetakh, "Notes on The Cuffs"], short stories, "Nakanune", Moscow: 1922; "Vozrozhdenie", Moscow: 1923; "Rossija", Moscow: 1923; "Zvezda Vostoka", Taskent: 1973, n. 3. Translated in English with the title Notes on Cuffs.
 Белая гвардия [Belaya Gvardiya, "The White Guard"], novel, "Rossiya", Moscow: 1924-1925  [incomplete]; first complete edition in Izbrannaya proza ["Chosen Prose"], 1966. Translated with the title The White Guard.
 Дьяволиада [D'javoljada], short novel, "Al'manach 'Nedra'", IV, 1924; "Nedra", Moscow: 1926; London: 1970.
 Собачье сердце ["Heart of a Dog"], 1925; edited with introduction and commentary by Avril Pyman, London: Bristol Classical, 1994 (Russian text with English critical apparatus). Translated with the title Heart of a Dog.
 Роковые яйца [Rokovye Yaytsa, "Fatal eggs"], novel, "Al'manach 'Nedra'", VI, 1925; London: 1970. Translated with the title Fatal Eggs.  (In at least one Hesperus edition of Fatal Eggs the preface writer gives away the ending in the preface.)
 Похождения Чичикова ["Chichikov's adventures"], 1925.
 Записки юного врача [Zapiski Yunogo Vracha, "Notes of a country doctor"], short stories, "Krasnaya Panorama" and "Meditsinsky Rabotnik", Moscow: 1925-1926.
 [Rasskazy], Moscow: 1926.
 Морфий [Morfij, "Morfine"], 1926.  
 Жизнь господина де Мольера ["Life of Monsieur de Molière"], 1936.
 Театральный роман ["Theatrical novel"], unfinished novel written between 1936 and 1939, "Novy Mir" 1965. It has been translated into English as Black Snow, or the Theatrical Novel and as A Dead Man's Memoir (A Theatrical Novel).
 Мастер и Маргарита [Master i Margarita, "The Master and Margarita"], novel written between 1929 and 1939, first edition partially censored in "Moskva", Moscow, n. 11, 1966 and n. 1, 1967; first complete edition in Russian, Frankfurt: 1969. Translated with the title The Master and Margarita.

Theater
 Зойкина квартира, [Zoikina kvartira, "Zoya's apartment"], 1925. Contemporary satire.
 Дни Турбиных [Dni Turbinykh, The Days of the Turbins], first representation October 5, 1926. Published Moscow: 1965'; Letchworth (UK): 1970. Based on the novel The White Guard, describes one family's survival in Kiev during the Russian Civil War.
 Бег [Beg, "Flight"], 1926-1928. Translated with the title Flight. Satirizing the flight of White emigrants to the West.
 Багровый остров, 1927 (The Crimson Island)
 Кабала святош [Kabala svyatosh, The Cabal of Hypocrites/Molière], 1929. Molière's relations with Louis XIV's court.
 Адам и Ева [Adam i Eva, "Adam and Eve"], 1931.
 Блаженство ["Beatitude"], 1933-1934. 
 Иван Васильевич ["Ivan Vasilyevich"], 1934-1935. Ivan the Terrible brought by a Time Machine to a crowded apartment in the 1930s Moscow, screen version: Ivan Vasilievich: back to the future.
 Дон Кихот [Don Kikhot, Don Quixote], 1937-1938.
 Пушкин [Puskin, "Pushkin"] or Последние дни [Poslednie Dni, "The last days"], 1940. The last days of the great Russian poet.
 Батум [Batum, "Batumi"]. Translated as Batum. Joseph Stalin's early years in Batumi.

Anthologies, collected works and letters
 [P'esy, "Comedies"], Moscow: 1962.
 [Dramy i Komedii, "Dramas and comedies"], Moscow: 1965.
 [Izbrannaya proza, "Selected Prose"], Moscow: 1966.
 [Romany, "Novels"], Moscow: 1974.
 [Pis'ma, "Letters"], Moscow: Sovremennik, 1989.

Bibliographies by writer
Bibliography
Bibliographies of Russian writers
Dramatist and playwright bibliographies